The Jersey Fire and Rescue Service is the statutory fire and rescue service which deals with a broad range of incidents in the Jersey area, including fires, road accidents, emergencies at sea, rescues from height, cliff based operations and incidents involving hazardous substances.

Performance
A review of the service in 2022 highlighted "structural and resourcing challenges" which prevented it from fulfilling basic functions adequately and inhibited necessary change.

Fire stations  

The service has two fire stations: Rouge Bouillon, which is crewed by wholetime firefighters and retained firefighters; and St Brelade, which is crewed by retained firefighters.

Inshore rescue
The service is trained and equipped to respond to incidents at sea, and close to shore. This can involve recovering people who have become stranded on rocks which are exposed when the tide is low, and submerged at high-tide.

The service has recently developed its own Inshore Rescue Boat. The hull is a Humber Base, unlike the previous D-class lifeboat (EA16) lifeboat. Fabrication and development included DPM Nautique and FRS Personnel

Cliff rescue
Jersey has many cliffs on its coastline, and the service is able to rescue people from these cliffs using specialised equipment.

See also

2012 Jersey gas holder fire

References

External links

2000 establishments in Jersey
Organisations based in Jersey
Emergency services in Jersey